DJH can refer to 

Danish School of Journalism
Degrassi Junior High, a Canadian teen drama television series
DJH Models, a British manufacturer of scale model kits
German Youth Hostel Association
Jebel Ali Seaplane Base, United Arab Emirates (IATA code: DJH)